Pará State University (UEPA) is the only public university maintained by the state government of Pará, Brazil. The university has over 14,000 students enrolled in its 57 courses, from which 23 are undergraduate and 34 are graduate programs. Those programs are offered across UEPA's 20 campuses in the cities of Belém (five campuses), Paragominas, Conceição do Araguaia, Marabá, Altamira, Igarapé-Açu, São Miguel do Guamá, Santarém, Tucuruí, Moju, Redenção, Barcarena, Vigia de Nazaré, Cametá, Salvaterra, and Castanhal.

References

     Relatório Anual de Gestão da UEPA - Exercício 2019
     http://doi.org/10.5281/zenodo.4095582

External links
 Official Website of the State University of Pará

Universities and colleges in Pará
Educational institutions established in 1993
1993 establishments in Brazil
State universities in Brazil